The Australian International Player of the Year (or Gaze Medal) is an award for the best player of the Australia men's national basketball team, given annually between 1988 and 2012 and then sporadically during the rest of the 2010s. The voting for the award is done by the players after each international match and is named after father-son duo Lindsay Gaze and Andrew Gaze.

 1988 Phil Smyth
 1989 Luc Longley
 1990 Andrew Gaze
 1991 Andrew Vlahov
 1992 Mark Bradtke
 1993 Andrew Vlahov
 1994 Andrew Gaze
 1995 Andrew Gaze
 1996 Andrew Gaze
 1997 Shane Heal
 1998 Andrew Gaze
 1999 Mark Bradtke
 2000 Andrew Gaze
 2001 Brett Maher
 2002 Chris Anstey
 2003 Matthew Nielsen
 2004 Shane Heal
 2005 C. J. Bruton
 2006 Sam Mackinnon
 2007 Sam Mackinnon
 2008 Patty Mills
 2009 Joe Ingles
 2010 Patty Mills
 2011 Brad Newley
 2012 Joe Ingles
 2013 Unknown
 2014 Unknown
 2015 Unknown
 2016 Andrew Bogut
 2017 Unknown
 2018 Unknown
 2019 Nick Kay and Nathan Sobey
 2020 Unknown
 2021 Unknown

References

External links

 Gaze Medal winners 1988–2010
 Maher Medal winners 1988–2010
 2011 Maher Medal winner
 2008 Basketball Australia Annual Report
 2009/2010 Basketball Australia Annual Report

player
Australian sports trophies and awards
Basketball players in Australia
Basketball trophies and awards